Platycorynus marginalis is a species of leaf beetle from East Africa and the Democratic Republic of the Congo. It was first described from Uhehe, a region now part of Tanzania, by Julius Weise in 1912.

Subspecies
There are two subspecies of P. marginalis:

 Platycorynus marginalis luluensis (Burgeon, 1940)
 Platycorynus marginalis marginalis (Weise, 1912)

References

Eumolpinae
Beetles of the Democratic Republic of the Congo
Taxa named by Julius Weise
Insects of Tanzania